Spring Canyon is a canyon and tributary creek of Alamosa Creek in Socorro County, New Mexico. Its mouth is at an elevation if  near its creek,s confluence with Alamosa Creek.

References 

Valleys of New Mexico
Landforms of Socorro County, New Mexico